Ángel Natalio Allegri was an Argentine footballer. He played during his entire 14-year professional career for Vélez Sársfield in the Argentine Primera División, totaling 384 games and 36 goals. He is the third player with most appearances in the club's history, behind Fabian Cubero (who have 458) and Pedro Larraquy (who has 457).

Allegri also has the negative record of most own goals scored in the Argentine Primera, with 7.

Club career
Allegri played his first game for Vélez Sársfield in 1946. In the 1953 championship, he was an integral part of the team that finished runner-up, behind River Plate. The defender retired in 1960.

International career
Allegri also played 4 games for the Argentina national team between 1950 and 1951.

References

External links
Statistics at BDFA 

1926 births
1981 deaths
Footballers from Buenos Aires
Argentine footballers
Association football defenders
Argentina international footballers
Argentine Primera División players
Club Atlético Vélez Sarsfield footballers
Club Atlético Colón managers